Bushfield is a town in Australia. It is joined with the nearby Woodford to make Woodford-Bushfield.

At the 2016 census, the population was 571.

Bushfield Post Office opened on 16 February 1885 and closed in 1974.

The Bushfield Oval is popular during the New Year's Eve celebrations. It is the home of the North Warrnambool Football Club, the club was formed when the local Bushfield side merged with the Grassmere team and called themselves Northern Districts. When the club was admitted to the Hampden FL it became North Warrnambool.

The other place of interest is a former milk bar that was taken down in 2002. This milk bar provided lunch orders for students at Woodford Primary School.

References

External links

Warrnambool
Towns in Victoria (Australia)